The Nabadwip Dham–Malda Town Express is an Express train belonging to Eastern Railway zone that runs between  and Nabadwip Dham railway station in Indian state of West Bengal. It is currently being operated with 13421/13422 train numbers on a daily basis.

Service

The 13421/Nabadwip Dham–Malda Town Express has average speed of 47 km/hr and covers 227 km in 4 h 50 m. The 13422/Malda Town–Nabadwip Dham Express has average speed of 45 km/hr and covers 227 km in 5 h 5 m.

Route and halts 

The important halts of the train are:

Coach composition

The train has standard ICF rakes with max speed of 110 km/h. The train consists of 12 coaches:

 10 Second Seating 
 2 Seating cum Luggage Rake
 Coach Sequence: 
GEN D1 D2 D3 D4 D5 D6 D7 D8 D9  D10 GEN

Traction

Both trains were earlier hauled by a Howrah Loco Shed or Bardhaman Loco Shed-based WDM-3A diesel locomotive from Nabadwip to English Bazar and vice versa. As the route is now fully electrified, a Howrah shed based WAP-4 or WAP-7
powers the train for its entire journey.

See also 

 Malda Town railway station
 Nabadwip Dham railway station
 Kolkata–Radhikapur Express
 Hate Bazare Express
 Howrah–Balurghat Bi-Weekly Express

Notes

References

External links 

 13421/Nabadwip Dha–Malda Town Express
 13422/Malda Town–Nabadwip Dham Express

Transport in Maldah
Express trains in India
Rail transport in West Bengal
Railway services introduced in 2009